The A. G. Long House is a historic house in Portland, Oregon, United States. Built in 1908, it is perhaps the finest example of residential Colonial Revival architecture from the years soon after the style was introduced to Portland. It is additionally notable for its unusual admixture of Craftsman elements to the overall Colonial form, especially on the interior. The house was added to the National Register of Historic Places in 1993.

See also
National Register of Historic Places listings in Southwest Portland, Oregon

References

External links

Houses on the National Register of Historic Places in Portland, Oregon
Houses completed in 1908
Colonial Revival architecture in Oregon
American Craftsman architecture in Oregon
1908 establishments in Oregon
Southwest Portland, Oregon
Portland Historic Landmarks